HMS Mallow has been the name of more than one ship of the British Royal Navy, and may refer to:

 , a  launched in 1940, transferred to the Yugoslav Navy as Nada in 1944, renamed Partizanka in 1946, returned to the Royal Navy in 1948, sold to the Egyptian Navy in 1948 and renamed El Sudan, and deleted from the Egyptian Navy list in 1982.

Royal Navy ship names